The Tianpu Reservoir is a reservoir in Jinsha Township, Kinmen County, Taiwan. It is the catchment area of water supplied from Mainland China through the Jinjiang–Kinmen Pipeline.

Geology
The reservoir has an effective capacity of 599,000 m3. The main local source for the reservoir comes from Qianpu River in Kinmen and supply from Mainland China originated from Longhu Lake in Fujian.

See also
 Jinjiang–Kinmen Pipeline

References

Jinsha Township
Lakes of Kinmen County
Reservoirs in Taiwan